Flynn is an unincorporated community in Benton County, Oregon, United States. Flynn is located on U.S. Route 20 at its interchange with Oregon Route 34, just west of Philomath, near the Marys River.

Mass media
Philomath Bulletin, weekly newspaper

References

Unincorporated communities in Benton County, Oregon
Unincorporated communities in Oregon